The 2012 Eastern Illinois Panthers football team represented Eastern Illinois University as a member of the Ohio Valley Conference (OVC) during the 2012 NCAA Division I FCS football season. Led by first-year head coach Dino Babers, the Panthers compiled an overall record of 7–5 overall with a mark of 6–1 in conference play, winning the OVC title. Eastern Illinois earned the conference's automatic bid into the NCAA Division I Football Championship playoffs, where they lost in the first round to South Dakota State. The team played home games at O'Brien Field in Charleston, Illinois.

Schedule

References

Eastern Illinois
Eastern Illinois Panthers football seasons
Ohio Valley Conference football champion seasons
Eastern Illinois
Eastern Illinois Panthers football